The Learning & Performance Institute (LPI) is an independent global body for learning professionals. First established in 1995 as the Institute of IT Training (IITT), it completed a management buyout from membership and research organisation, the National Computing Centre in February 2010, and is now an entirely independent body.

The LPI's focus is on learning efficacy - the demonstrable impact of learning on individual and organisational performance. It does this through a portfolio of services including research and data, professional membership, accreditation, events, certifications, original software tools, and consulting.



Professional Standards

The LPI aims to continuously raise standards of professionalism within the workplace learning and development (L&D) industry.

Membership

The LPI provides various levels of individual membership for learning professionals. The level of membership afforded to an individual is dependent on their level of experience, skills and qualifications gained in the Learning and Development industry.

LPI membership carries postal-nominal letters which vary depending on the level of membership. The highest level of membership is Fellow (FLPI) and is reserved only for professionals who can demonstrate considerable experience and expertise within the workplace L&D field.

Accreditation

Organisations and commercial providers of learning products and technologies are awarded the LPI's accreditation if they meet definitive standards in the implementation and delivery of learning. As part of accreditation, the LPI works with accredited companies to monitor their performance, and to provide ongoing support via data-driven recommendations and consulting. LPI accreditation is thus not a check-box exercise but a continuous programme of guided performance improvement.

Certifications

The LPI offers certification programmes to individuals employed in the L&D industry. Its flagship certification is the Certified Online Learning Facilitator (COLF), which was launched in 2010 and has since become the de facto standard for learning professionals wanting to upskill in virtual classroom facilitation and design.

Tools

The LPI offers free tools to help learning professionals at all levels of seniority understand individual and departmental strengths and weaknesses. The data from these tools also helps to highlight industry trends and areas of concern that can be referenced by both commercial and non-commercial learning entities. For example, the LPI's Capability Map assesses and monitors skill levels in 25 areas deemed critical for modern learning professionals. This data can provide a view of skills gaps that can be used in HR, recruitment, and talent development systems. The Learning and Performance Accelerator is a similar tool for learning heads and managers – evaluating performance in organisational learning across areas such as leadership, culture, data, technology, skills, and infrastructure.

Events

The LPI manages and runs face-to-face and virtual events for the L&D community, with LEARNING LIVE and The Learning Awards being its two flagship events.

References

Education in Coventry
Information technology organisations based in the United Kingdom
Organisations based in Coventry
Science and technology in the West Midlands (county)